Remo Venturi (born 21 April 1927, in Spoleto) is a former Italian Grand Prix motorcycle road racer. His best years were in 1959 and 1960 when he finished second in the 500cc world championship to his MV Agusta teammate, John Surtees.

Motorcycle Grand Prix results 

(key) (Races in italics indicate fastest lap)

References

1927 births
People from Spoleto
Italian motorcycle racers
125cc World Championship riders
250cc World Championship riders
350cc World Championship riders
500cc World Championship riders
Living people
Sportspeople from the Province of Perugia